José of Braganza may refer to:

 José, Prince of Brazil, Duke of Braganza (1761 – 1788)
 José of Braganza, Archbishop of Braga (1703 – 1756)
 José of Braganza, High Inquisitor of Portugal (1720 – 1801)